KS AZS Częstochowa SSA was a Polish professional men's volleyball club based in Częstochowa, founded in 1945 as a university team (AZS). The club competed in the Polish PlusLiga from to 1979 to 2017. Six–time Polish Champion, two–time Polish Cup winner, and one time CEV Challenge Cup winner.

Honours

Domestic
 Polish Championship
Winners (6): 1989–90, 1992–93, 1993–94, 1994–95, 1996–97, 1998–99

 Polish Cup
Winners (2): 1997–98, 2007–08

International
 CEV Challenge Cup
Winners (1): 2011–12

Former names

See also

External links

 Team profile at Volleybox.net

Polish volleyball clubs
Sport in Częstochowa
Volleyball clubs established in 1945
1945 establishments in Poland